Sokollu (Serbo-Croatian and Bosnian: Sokolović) is a prominent Bosnian family of Serbian ethnic origin. Notable members of the family were high state officials in the Ottoman Empire during the 16th century. Prominent members include Sokollu Mehmed Pasha, Ferhad Pasha Sokolović, Makarije Sokolović, and Savatije Sokolović.

See also
Sokolović

References

Surnames